Dajia District is a coastal suburban district in Taichung, Taiwan. It is located on the northwestern corner of Taichung. The climate of the region is Sub-tropical, and the average temperature is roughly 24 degrees Celsius. In March 2012, it was named one of the Top 10 Small Tourist Towns by the Tourism Bureau of Taiwan.

History 

The local Taokas tribe people used to live in the area before the Han people arrived. Their main activities were hunting and farming. The Han Chinese started to arrive around 1669 during the Ming Dynasty in which most of them came from Fujian, especially Quanzhou. Dajia used to be an urban township of Taichung County. On 25 December 2010, it was upgraded to become a district of the new special municipality of Taichung.

Administrative divisions 
Zhaoyang, Dajia, Shuntian, Kongmen, Pingan, Zhuangmei, Xinmei, Minshan, Zhongshan, Nanyang, Xunfeng, Yihe, Wuling, Wenqu, Wuqu, Wenwu, Fenghua, Dehua, Jiangnan, Dingdian, Taibai, Mengchun, Xingfu, Rinan, Longquan, Xiqi, Tongan, Fude and Jianxing Village.

Economy

Notable products 
 Dajia East Pottery
 Yutou etc.
 Nǎiyóu sū bǐng (奶油酥餅) – A buttery flaky pastry with a thin round shape
 Purple jade su – a taro dessert

Native products 
 Rice
 Taro
 Scallion
 Sweet potato
 Bitter melon
 Straw hats and products

Industrial products 
 Bicycle-Giant Manufacturing is Established 1972 in Dajia

Tourist attractions 

 Dajia Jenn Lann Temple
 Sword Well
 Chenggong Park
 Dajia Wenchang Temple
 Kuo Xing Temple
 Military Memorial Park
 Zhongzheng Park

Dajia Mazu Sightseeing Cultural Festival, Taichung
A religious and pompous event – Dajia Mazu border-tour of incense-offering

In the spring of Taiwan, amidst blossoming natural flowers, every locality is stirred for the event of welcoming and receiving Mazu.  Mazu, being long stalled adored in the temple, is being shouldered by worshippers to view the spring for blessing.  Everyone with religious sentiment happily participates in the event of the joyful god-welcoming competitions.

Among these events to welcome Mazu, held in every locality, is the border-tour of incense-offering of "Dajia, Taichung Mazu Sightseeing Cultural Festival." The tour would travel across the city and village of the former Taichung County (now part of Taichung City), Changhua County, Yunlin County, and Chiayi County and is considered to be one of the major events of Taiwan's religious community. As a whole, the tour would march a distance on foot of 330 kilometers, and lasts over 7 days and 8 nights, passing by more than eighty participating temples. During the border-tour of incense-offering, both the traditional folk arts as well as new-generation artistic performance of Taiwan join in the tour for joy, attracting a great deal of attention.

As the worshippers travel through the county and city with the faith of Mazu, they build up friendships with people along the way. During the 7-day and 8-night tour of incense-offering, there are joyful and exciting events and religious prayer as well as concentrated and ascetic sentiments – a co-existence of the heavenly and temporary, while artistic performances of the ancient, contemporary, local, or overseas are staged within the same context of space and time. As a result, the intermingled moments of religious faith and an exhilarating joyful atmosphere have confirmed the religious faith of the people of Taiwan.

In recent years, the festival is increasingly attracting the growing number of Mazu worshippers in mainland China – in 2010 there were more than 2,000 mainland followers from about 40 Mazu temples. President Ma Ying-jeou also attended.

Transportation 

 TRA Dajia Station
 TRA Rinan Station
Taiwan High Speed Rail passes through the eastern part of the district, but no station is currently planned.

Notable natives 
 Chiu Tai-san, Minister of Justice (2016–2018)
 Hsueh Ling, member of 8th Legislative Yuan
 Liu Sung-pan, Vice President of Legislative Yuan (1990–1991)
 Peng Ming-min, Presidential candidate for 1996 presidential election
 Huang Poren

See also 
 Dajia River

References 

Districts of Taichung
Taiwan placenames originating from Formosan languages